The 2018 Vermont Senate election took place as part of the biennial United States elections. Vermont voters elected State Senators in all 30 seats. State senators serve two-year terms in the Vermont Senate. A primary election on August 14, 2018, determined which candidates appeared on the November 6 general election ballot.

Following the 2016 State Senate elections, Democrats maintained effective control of the Senate with 23 members in the majority caucus (21 Democrats and 2 Progressives). To claim control of the chamber from Democrats, the Republicans would have needed to net gain 8 or 9 seats depending on the winner of the 2018 Vermont Lieutenant Governor election, which was Progressive Dave Zuckerman. However, in the elections, the Democrats instead gained one seat from the Republicans.

Summary of results
Primary election results can be obtained from the Vermont Secretary of State's website.

Sources:

Detailed results
Note: Primary election results are only shown for contested primary elections. For information on non-contested primaries, visit the Vermont Secretary of State's website.

Addison
Elects 2 senators.
Incumbent Democrats Claire Ayer, who has represented the Addison district since 2003, didn't seek re-election. Incumbent Democrat Christopher Bray, who has represented the Addison district since 2013, was re-elected. Fellow Democrat Ruth Hardy won the open seat.

Bennington
Elects 2 senators.
Incumbent Democrats Dick Sears, who has represented the Bennington district since 1993, and Brian Campion, who has represented the Bennington district since 2015, were both re-elected.

Caledonia
Incumbent Democrat Jane Kitchel, who has represented the Caledonia district since 2005, and incumbent Republican Minority Leader Joe Benning, who has represented the Caledonia district since 2011, were both re-elected.
Elects 2 senators.

Chittenden
Elects 6 senators.
Incumbent Democrat Philip Baruth, who has represented the Chittenden district since 2011, incumbent Progressive Christopher Pearson, who has represented the Chittenden district since 2017, incumbent Democratic President pro tempore Tim Ashe, who has represented the Chittenden district since 2009, incumbent Democrat Ginny Lyons, who has represented the Chittenden district since 2001, incumbent Democrat Debbie Ingram, who has represented the Chittenden district since 2017, and incumbent Democrat Michael Sirotkin, who has represented the Chittenden district since 2014, were all re-elected.

Essex-Orleans
Elects 2 senators.
Incumbent Democrats Robert Starr, who has represented the Essex-Orleans district since 2005, and John Rodgers, who has represented the Essex-Orleans district since 2013, were both re-elected.

Franklin
Elects 2 senators.
Incumbent Republican Randy Brock, who has represented the Franklin district since 2017, was re-elected. Incumbent Republican Carolyn Whitney Branagan, who has represented the Franklin district since 2003, retired. Fellow Republican Corey Parent won the open seat.

Grand Isle
Elects 1 senator.
Incumbent Democrat Richard Mazza, who has represented the Grand Isle district since 1985, was re-elected.

Lamoille
Elects 1 senator.
Incumbent Republican Richard Westman, who has represented the Lamoille district since 2011, was re-elected.

Orange
Elects 1 senator.
Incumbent Democrat Mark MacDonald, who has represented the Orange district since 2003, was re-elected.

Rutland
Elects 3 senators.
Incumbent Republican Brian Collamore, who has represented the Rutland district since 2015, was re-elected. Incumbent Republican David Soucy, who has represented the Rutland district since 2017, lost re-nomination. Incumbent Republican Peg Flory, who has represented the Rutland district since 2011, retired. Republican James McNeil and Democrat Cheryl Hooker won the open seats.

Washington
Elects 3 senators.
Incumbent Democrats Ann Cummings, who has represented the Washington district since 1997, and incumbent Progressive Minority Leader Anthony Pollina, who has represented the Washington district since 2011, were both re-elected. Incumbent Democrat Francis Brooks, who has represented the Washington district since 2017, retired. Fellow Democrat Andrew Perchlik won the open seat.

Windham
Elects 2 senators.
Incumbent Democratic Majority Leader Becca Balint, who has represented the Windham district since 2015, and incumbent Democrat Jeanette White, who has represented the Windham district since 2003, were both re-elected.

Windsor
Elects 3 senators.
Incumbent Democrats Alison Clarkson, who has represented the Windsor district since 2017, Richard McCormack, who has represented the Windsor district since 2007, and incumbent Democrat Alice Nitka, who has represented the windsor district since 2007, were all re-elected.

See also
2018 United States elections
2018 Vermont elections
2018 United States Senate election in Vermont
2018 United States House of Representatives election in Vermont
2018 Vermont gubernatorial election
2018 Vermont House of Representatives election

References

Senate
Vermont Senate elections
Vermont Senate